A number of steamships were named Nancy Moller, including –

, purchased in 1934, torpedoed and sunk by Japanese submarine I-165 on 18 March 1944.
, in service until 1921 when sold and renamed Hen Li.
, in service under that name during 1951.

Ship names